Kenneth Stanford McBride (March 23, 1929 – May 14, 2005) was an American professional basketball player. McBride was selected in the 1952 NBA draft by the Syracuse Nationals after a collegiate career at Maryland State. He played for the Milwaukee Hawks in just 12 games during the 1954–55 season.

References

1929 births
2005 deaths
American men's basketball players
Basketball players from Illinois
Maryland Eastern Shore Hawks men's basketball players
Milwaukee Hawks players
People from Centralia, Illinois
Shooting guards
Syracuse Nationals draft picks